United Nations Security Council resolution 1081, adopted unanimously on 27 November 1996, after considering a report by the Secretary-General Boutros Boutros-Ghali regarding the United Nations Disengagement Observer Force (UNDOF), the Council noted its efforts to establish a durable and just peace in the Middle East.

The resolution called upon the parties concerned to immediately implement Resolution 338 (1973). It renewed the mandate of the Observer Force for another six months until 31 May 1997 and requested that the Secretary-General submit a report on the situation at the end of that period.

See also
 Arab–Israeli conflict
 Golan Heights
 Israel–Syria relations
 List of United Nations Security Council Resolutions 1001 to 1100 (1995–1997)

References

External links
 
Text of the Resolution at undocs.org

 1081
 1081
 1081
1996 in Israel
1996 in Syria
November 1996 events